The New Fourth Army Incident, also known as the South Anhui Incident, occurred in China in January 1941 during the Second Sino-Japanese War, during which the Chinese Civil War was in theory suspended, uniting the Communists and Nationalists against the Japanese. It is significant as the end of real cooperation between the Nationalists and Communists. Today, ROC and PRC historians view the New Fourth Army Incident differently. From the ROC point of view, the Communists attacked first and it was a punishment for the Communist insubordination; from the PRC view, it was Nationalist treachery.

Causes

ROC viewpoint
In the fall of 1940, the Communist New Fourth Army attacked Nationalist forces under Han Deqin. Also, Benton's book New Fourth Army argues the Communists first attacked the Nationalists and the Nationalists fought back against the Communists.

PRC viewpoint
For PRC historians the incident began in December 1940, when Chiang Kai-shek ordered Eighth Route Army and the New Fourth Army to withdraw from Anhui and Jiangsu to the north of the old Yellow River track in a month. In response, the Communist Party only agreed to move the New Fourth Army troops in Southern Anhui (Wannan) to the northern shore of the Yangtze River. On 4 January, the 9000-strong force started to move from Yunling Township in Jing County towards Jiangsu, planning to cross the river along three routes.

Ambush
On January 5, the Communist forces were surrounded in Maolin Township by a Nationalist force of 80,000 led by Shangguan Yunxiang and attacked days later. After days of fighting, heavy losses – including many civilian workers who staffed the army's political headquarters – were inflicted on the New Fourth Army due to the overwhelming numbers of Nationalist troops. On January 13, Ye Ting, wanting to save his men, went to Shangguan Yunxiang's headquarters to negotiate terms. Upon arrival, Ye was detained. The New Fourth Army's political commissar Xiang Ying was killed, and only 2,000 people, led by Huang Huoxing and Fu Qiutao, were able to break out.

Aftermath
Chiang Kai-shek ordered the New Fourth Army disbanded on January 17, and sent Ye Ting to a military tribunal. However, on January 20, the Chinese Communist Party in Yan'an ordered the reorganization of the army. Chen Yi was the new army commander. Liu Shaoqi was the political commissar. The new headquarters was in Jiangsu, which was now the general headquarters for the New Fourth Army and the Eighth Route Army. Together, they comprised seven divisions and one independent brigade, totalling over 90,000 troops.

Because of this incident, according to the Chinese Communist Party, the Nationalist Party of China was criticized for creating internal strife when the Chinese were supposed to be united against the Japanese; the Chinese Communist Party, on the other hand, was seen as heroes at the vanguard of the fight against the Japanese and Nationalist treachery. Although as a result of this incident, the Communist Party lost possession of the lands south of Yangtze River, it drew the party support from the population, which strengthened their foundations north of Yangtze River.

According to the Nationalist Party, this incident was retribution to numerous occasions of treachery and harassment by the New Fourth Army.

The novelist Mao Dun's story Fushi is about this incident.

Notes

Further reading
 Benton, Gregor. New Fourth Army: Communist Resistance along the Yangtze and the Huai, 1938–1941.  Berkeley: University of California Press, 1999. 949 pages. 
This articles uses the translation of the corresponding Chinese-language article, retrieved on August 24, 2006.

Conflicts in 1941
National Revolutionary Army
Military operations of the Chinese Civil War
1941 in China
Military history of Anhui